This is a List of FIA Formula 3 Championship drivers, that is, a list of drivers who have made at least one race start in the FIA Formula 3 Championship, which was established in 2019. 

This list is accurate up to and including the Sakhir round of the 2023 FIA Formula 3 Championship.

By name

Drivers in bold will compete in the 2023 FIA Formula 3 Championship.

By racing license

Footnotes

References

 
FIA Formula 3 Championship drivers